The badminton men's doubles tournament at the 2002 Asian Games in Busan took place from 11 November to 14 November at Gangseo Gymnasium.

The Korean duo of Lee Dong-soo and Yoo Yong-sung won the gold in this tournament.

Schedule
All times are Korea Standard Time (UTC+09:00)

Results
Legend
WO — Won by walkover

References

External links
 2002 Asian Games Official Website

Men's doubles